V. Hangkhanlian is an Indian politician. He was elected to the Manipur Legislative Assembly from Churachandpur in the 2017 Manipur Legislative Assembly election as a member of the Bharatiya Janata Party. He is Minister of Agriculture, Veterinary and Animal Husbandry in N. Biren Singh cabinet.

References

1961 births
Living people
People from Churachandpur district
Manipur MLAs 2017–2022
Bharatiya Janata Party politicians from Manipur
National People's Party (India) politicians